Edgefield Historic District is a historic neighborhood in East Nashville, Tennessee. It was listed on the National Register of Historic Places listings in Davidson County, Tennessee (NRHP) in 1977.

History
The area started in the early 1800s as a rural Nashville neighborhood. Many wealthy people and professionals from Nashville built estates in Edgefield. The outlaw Jesse James lived in Edgefield and his address was 712 Fatherland Street. In 1869 Edgefield became a city, and in 1880, it was annexed by the city of Nashville. The city of Edgefield originally earned its name from Governor Neill S. Brown: he named it for the plains along the river.

Architecture
Buildings in the district were constructed from 1850 to 1874 and 1900–1924. They feature a variety of architectural styles including: Italianate architecture, Stick architecture, Eastlake architecture and Queen Anne style architecture.

NRHP
The District was added to the National Register of Historic Places listings in Davidson County, Tennessee on July 13, 1977.

References

National Register of Historic Places in Nashville, Tennessee
Historic districts on the National Register of Historic Places in Tennessee
Neighborhoods in Nashville, Tennessee
Populated places in Davidson County, Tennessee